Pearl van der Wissel (born 14 April 1984) is a former Dutch handballer, who last played for Odense Håndbold and the Dutch national handball team. She ended her career in 2018.

References

1984 births
Living people
Dutch female handball players
Dutch sportspeople of Surinamese descent
Sportspeople from Leiden
Expatriate handball players
Dutch expatriates in Denmark
21st-century Dutch women